Zinatlu (also Romanized as Zīnatlū) is a village in Shiramin Rural District, Howmeh District, Azarshahr County, East Azerbaijan Province, Iran. At the 2006 census, its population was 306, in 60 families.

References 

Populated places in Azarshahr County